The Way of the Wind is an upcoming epic biblical drama film written and directed by Terrence Malick and produced by Josh Jeter. Starring Géza Röhrig as Jesus, the film retells his story. Alongside Rohrig, Mark Rylance stars as Satan, Matthias Schoenaerts as Saint Peter while Ben Kingsley, Joseph Fiennes, Tawfeek Barhom, Douglas Booth, and Aidan Turner star in supporting roles.

Premise 
The Way of the Wind retells and chronicles several episodes in the life story of Jesus Christ.

Cast

 Géza Röhrig as Jesus Christ
 Mark Rylance as Satan
 Matthias Schoenaerts as Saint Peter
 Philip Arditti as Hosea
 Nabil Elouahabi as Saint Stephen
 Aidan Turner as Saint Andrew
 Con O'Neill as Enoch
 Joseph Mawle as Saul
 Karel Roden as Mamon
 Martin McCann as Marcellus
 Sarah-Sofie Boussnina as Claudia
 Laëtitia Eïdo as Anna
 Ali Suliman as Cleopas
 Shadi Mar'i as Asher
 Selim Bayraktar as Jonathan
 Ori Pfeffer as Ahaziah
 Selva Rasalingam as Jeroboam
 Tawfeek Barhom as John
 Sebastiano Filocamo as Prodigal Elder Brother
 Makram Khoury as Jonas
 Ben Kingsley 
 Joseph Fiennes
 Douglas Booth
 Sarah Greene
 Mathieu Kassovitz
 Numan Acar
 Björn Thors
 Franz Rogowski
 Leila Hatami as Mary Magdalene

Production
Reports began circulating in June 2019 that Terrence Malick had begun filming his next project, known as The Last Planet, near the town of Anzio, Italy. By July, filming was reportedly occurring in Iceland, with Ben Kingsley and Björn Thors reported to have been cast and present for filming. In September, Mark Rylance, Matthias Schoenaerts, Géza Röhrig, Joseph Fiennes, Douglas Booth, Lorenzo Gioielli, Sebastiano Filocamo and Aidan Turner were cast, with Rylance directly confirming the film and stating that he would be playing four versions of Satan. Joseph Mawle was added in October.

References

External links
 

Upcoming films
Films directed by Terrence Malick
Films scored by Eleni Karaindrou
Films shot in Iceland
Films shot in Lazio
Portrayals of Jesus in film
Upcoming English-language films